Laura Marie Kaeppeler (born March 2, 1988) is an American beauty pageant titleholder crowned Miss America 2012 on January 14, 2012, representing the state of Wisconsin. Kaeppeler was the first woman representing Wisconsin to win Miss America since Terry Meeuwsen won Miss America 1973. She was briefly on the board of directors for the Miss America Organization.

Background
Kaeppeler was born to Jeff and Sue Kaeppeler in Kenosha, Wisconsin. In 2009 Kaeppeler won the title of Miss Kenosha. She then went on to win the talent preliminary award and was second runner-up to Miss Wisconsin 2010, Kimberly Sawyer. One year later Kaeppeler won the title of Miss Southern Wisconsin 2010. At the 2011 Miss Wisconsin Pageant, she won the preliminary talent award, which she tied with Raeanna Johnson, who later took over the Miss Wisconsin title after Laura won Miss America.  She attended St. Joseph High School and Carthage College, where she graduated  in 2010 with a degree in music.

Miss America 2012 pageant
Kaeppeler was Wisconsin's representative at the Miss America 2012 competition held in Las Vegas, Nevada at the Theatre for the Performing Arts of Planet Hollywood Resort and Casino on January 14, 2012.

In the preliminary competition, Kaeppeler won the talent portion and a $2,000 scholarship with her rendition of the Luigi Arditi waltz "Il Bacio". She chose a platform of supporting and mentoring children of incarcerated parents, as her father served 18 months in prison for mail fraud.

In the lifestyle and fitness competition, she wore a white bikini, and for her evening gown, Kaeppeler wore a black customized Tony Bowls beaded dress.

In the final round, judge Lara Spencer asked Kaeppeler if beauty queens should declare their political viewpoint. Kaeppeler then answered, "Miss America represents everyone, so I think the message to political candidates is that they represent everyone as well. And so in these economic times, we need to be looking forward to what America needs, and I think Miss America needs to represent all."  Kaeppeler beat out first runner-up Miss Oklahoma 2011, Betty Thompson, for the title of Miss America 2012 and was crowned by Miss America 2011, Teresa Scanlan. Along with the title of Miss America, she also won a $50,000 scholarship.

Miss America role

Kaeppeler met President Obama through a joint meeting with the Children's Miracle Network Hospital Champions at the White House. Obama previously met with Miss America 2009 Katie Stam and Miss America 2010 Caressa Cameron during similar events.

Personal life
On April 6, 2014, Kaeppeler married television producer Mike Fleiss, who was a judge at the Miss America 2012 pageant which Kaeppeler won. The couple's son, Benjamin, was born in May 2015, and second son George was born in 2020.  Kaeppeler is currently the co-host of the Health Interrupted Podcast with celebrity fitness trainer Gina Lombardi.

References

External links
 laurakaeppeler.com

1988 births
Living people
Carthage College alumni
Miss America 2012 delegates
Miss America winners
People from Kenosha, Wisconsin
Miss America Preliminary Talent winners